Xinyang Agricultural College (XAC) is located in Xinyang City, a Southern Part of Henan Province, Central China, bordering on Shihe River on the north, lying at the foot of Mountain Xianshan on the west, overlooked by Mountain Jigongshan, one of the famous summer resorts in China.

History
Founded in 1911, located in Runan County, Zhumadian City, Henan Province, China, called RuNing mansion medium industrial school.

Moved to Xinyang City after 1949, its name was changed to Xinyang Agricultural School in 1958.

In 1992, Ministry of Education of the People's Republic of China renamed it Xinyang Agriculture College.

Departments
There are many departments, such as foreign languages and literature, computer, science, agronomy, animal husbandry, biologic engineering, horticulture, agriculture, economic management, etc.

See also
 http://www.chinatefl.com/henan/teach/xyny.htm Teach in Henan, China - Welcome to XAC.

References

External links
 Maojian tea
 Xinyang city

Education in Xinyang
Education in Henan
Universities and colleges in Henan
1911 establishments in China